Alain Julien Rudefoucauld (born 1950, Mostaganem, in Algeria), is a French author who has published several novels and plays. He also wrote about fifty articles in the humanities.

Works 
Publications
 Au fond de la mer (unpublished).
1991: En faire quoi, Bordeaux
1996: Fatsflat et Sacrifice, Le Bouscat, l'Esprit du temps
1997: Dutzoll-Frontier, Le Bouscat, l'Esprit du temps
1998: Paroles en pointillés (preface), Mérignac, S. Charpentier
1998: Autonomie d'un meurtre (novel), Paris, Calmann-Lévy
1998: Dancing, Le Bouscat, l'Esprit du temps
1999: Êtra ou la Clarté de l'éphémère, Le Bouscat, l'Esprit du temps
2003: J'irai seul, Éditions du Seuil
2004: L'Ordre et le Silence, Le Bouscat, l'Esprit du temps
2007: L'Ombre et le Pinceau (theatre), Paris, L'Harmattan
 Autonomie d'un meurtre (novel), L'Harmattan (reprint)
2009: C'est ici que je suis (theatre), L'Harmattan
2009: Mémoire de chair (theatre), Paris, L'Harmattan
2011: Sophie Coming Out (theatre), L'Harmattan
2012: Le Dernier Contingent (novel), Auch, Éditions Tristam - Prix France Culture/Télérama.
 Une si lente obscurité (novel), Auch, Éditions Tristram, 2013. - Prix 2013 de la Page 111

References

External links 
 "Le Dernier Contingent", d'Alain Julien Rudefoucauld : éblouissante jeunesse cabossée on Le Monde
 Alain Julien Rudefoucauld on the site of l'Harmatan
 SPONTICULES on YouTube
 Publications on CAIRN

21st-century French non-fiction writers
20th-century French dramatists and playwrights
21st-century French dramatists and playwrights
1950 births
People from Mostaganem
Living people